There are three Redruth transmitting stations:

Redruth (Four Lanes)

A broadcasting and telecommunications facility in west Cornwall. It is owned and operated by Arqiva. It transmits DVB television, FM radio and DAB radio (and previously, UHF Analogue television signals). It is sometimes referred to as Four Lanes, because of the proximity of the mast to neighbouring village of the same name. The main mast is lit with four bright red aircraft warning lights, a statutory requirement of the Civil Aviation Authority.

Redruth (Lanner)
A broadcasting transmitter at Lanner Hill. It transmits mediumwave radio signals. It was built in 1942 by German POWs. It is sometimes referred to as Redruth MF, short for Redruth Medium Frequency (Medium Wave). It is owned and run by Arqiva.

Redruth (Carnmenellis)
It is owned and run by BT.

Services available

Analogue radio (LW/MW)

Analogue radio (FM/VHF)

Digital radio (DAB)

Digital television

Before switchover

Analogue television
Analogue television is no longer transmitted from Redruth. BBC Two was closed on 8 July 2009 and the remaining four services on 5 August.

See also

List of radio stations in the United Kingdom
List of tallest structures in the United Kingdom
List of tallest structures in the world
Caradon Hill transmitting station

References

External links
Entry for Redruth transmitting station at The Transmission Gallery
Television Coverage Map
FM Coverage Map

Redruth Transmitter at thebigtower.com

Buildings and structures in Cornwall
Mass media in Cornwall
Transmitter sites in England
Unfree labor during World War II
Redruth